Imogen Stubbs (born 20 February 1961) is an English actress and writer.

Her first leading part was in Privileged (1982), followed by A Summer Story (1988).

Her first play, We Happy Few, was produced in 2004. In 2008 she joined Reader's Digest as a contributing editor and writer of fiction.

Early life
Imogen Stubbs was born in Rothbury, Northumberland, lived briefly in Portsmouth, Hampshire, where her father was a naval officer, and then moved with her parents to London, where they lived on a vintage river barge on the Thames. She was educated at Cavendish Primary School, then at two independent schools: St Paul's Girls' School and Westminster School, where Stubbs was one of the girls in the mixed sixth form, and Exeter College, Oxford, gaining a First Class degree.

Her acting career started at Oxford, where she played Irina in a student production of Three Sisters at the Oxford Playhouse. After graduating, she enrolled at RADA, and while there had her first professional work, playing Sally Bowles in Cabaret at the Wolsey Theatre, Ipswich. In 1982
she also appeared in her first film, Privileged.

Stubbs graduated from RADA in the same class as Jane Horrocks and Iain Glen, and later became an Associate Member of RADA.

Career
In the 1980s Stubbs achieved success on stage with the Royal Shakespeare Company, notably as Desdemona in Othello, which was directed by Trevor Nunn. Other stage work includes Saint Joan at the Strand Theatre and Heartbreak House at the Haymarket, and in 1997 she played in a London production of A Streetcar Named Desire.

In 1988, Stubbs was a notable Ursula Brangwen in a BBC serialization of The Rainbow, and in 1993 and 1994 had the title role in Anna Lee. She played Lucy Steele in Sense and Sensibility (1995).

In July 2004, Stubbs's play We Happy Few, directed by Trevor Nunn and starring Juliet Stevenson and Marcia Warren, opened at the Gielgud Theatre, London, after a try-out in Malvern. In September 2008 Reader's Digest announced that she had joined the magazine as a contributing editor and writer of adventure stories.

Personal life
In 1994, Stubbs married Trevor Nunn. The couple have two children: a son and a daughter, Ellie Nunn, who is also an actress. In April 2011, Stubbs announced that she and her husband were separating.

Filmography

Film

Television

Theatre

Other projects and contributions
When Love Speaks (2002, EMI Classics) – Shakespeare's "Sonnet 21" ("So it is not with me as with that Muse")

References

External links

1961 births
Alumni of Exeter College, Oxford
Alumni of RADA
English dramatists and playwrights
English film actresses
English stage actresses
English television actresses
Living people
Actresses from London
People educated at St Paul's Girls' School
People educated at Westminster School, London
Royal Shakespeare Company members
English Shakespearean actresses
Writers from London
Actresses from Newcastle upon Tyne
English women dramatists and playwrights
20th-century English actresses
21st-century English actresses
People from Rothbury
Actors from Northumberland
Actresses from Northumberland
English voice actresses
Wives of knights